Florence Fitzpatrick, 3rd Baron Upper Ossory (born Finghín Mac Giolla Phádraig; also known as Fineen Fitzpatrick) (died 3 February 1619), was the third son of Barnaby Fitzpatrick, 1st Baron Upper Ossory and his wife Margaret Butler, and inherited the title upon the death of his older brother Barnaby Fitzpatrick, 2nd Baron Upper Ossory in 1581. He married Catherine O'More, daughter of Patrick O'More of Abbeyleix, and had six children, including his son Teige, who succeeded as 4th Baron, and Joan (died c.1596/7) who married John Butler of Dunboyne (murdered in 1602), by whom she was the mother of Edmond Butler, 3rd/13th Baron Dunboyne.

Notes

External links
The Fitzpatrick – Mac Giolla Phádraig Clan Society
"It is easier to forgive an enemy than to forgive a friend": Barnaby FitzPatrick and Gaelic Collaboration with the Tudor crown c.1535-1581 : By Diarmuid Wheeler (Laois Heritage Society)
Jettisoning faith, culture and identity to serve the Crown: Elizabethan grant of land and title to Florence Fitzpatrick, 3rd baron of Upper Ossory, 1581 History Ireland

Florence
Year of birth missing
1619 deaths
People of Elizabethan Ireland
Barons in the Peerage of Ireland